Mario Gilbert Priester-Reading (10 August 1953 - 29 January 2017) was a British author.

Reading was born in Bournemouth in 1953, son of Gordon and Lieselotte Reading. He was brought up in England, Germany, and the South of France, and educated at Rugby School and at the University of East Anglia, where he studied Comparative Literature under Malcolm Bradbury and Angus Wilson.

His novels include The Music-Makers, and the bestselling Antichrist Trilogy (which has sold more than a million copies in 39 countries), comprising The Nostradamus Prophecies, The Mayan Codex, and The Third Antichrist. His newest series of novels features photojournalist John "The Templar" Hart: The Templar Prophecy came out in 2014, The Templar Inheritance in April 2015, and The Templar Succession, appeared in April 2016.

After years of battling cancer, Reading died on 29 January 2017.

Novels
The Music-Makers
The Nostradamus Prophecies
The Mayan Codex
The Third Antichrist
The Templar Prophecy
The Templar Inheritance
The Templar Succession
The Occupation Secret

Non-Fiction
The Dictionary Of Cinema
The Movie Companion
The Watkins Dictionary Of Dreams
Nostradamus: The Complete Prophecies For The Future
Nostradamus: The Good News
The Complete Prophecies Of Nostradamus
Nostradamus: The Top 100 Prophecies

References

External links
Official Website

1953 births
2017 deaths
People educated at Rugby School
Alumni of the University of East Anglia
Writers from Bournemouth
Mensans